John Kelvin Slater (January 25, 1952 – May 10, 2015) was a Canadian politician, who was elected as a BC Liberal Member of the Legislative Assembly of British Columbia in the 2009 provincial election, representing the riding of Boundary-Similkameen.

On January 14, 2013, Slater quit the BC Liberals after losing the nomination as the party's candidate in the 2013 election. Although he did plan to run as an independent,
he withdrew his candidacy shortly afterward.

Prior to his election to the legislature, he was mayor of Osoyoos. Slater died on May 10, 2015, at the age of 63.

References

British Columbia Liberal Party MLAs
1952 births
2015 deaths
Mayors of places in British Columbia
People from Kelowna
People from Osoyoos
21st-century Canadian politicians